The RiverRun International Film Festival  is an annual Oscar-qualifying film festival held each spring in Winston-Salem, North Carolina. The festival is a 501(c)3 non-profit organization and presents a variety of feature-length and short films from all genres, and also presents special events, regional premieres of significant films, celebrity tributes, family events and classic retrospectives as well as panel discussions and parties.

Jury Awards winners

Best Narrative Feature

Best Documentary Feature

History 

Founded in 1998 by Gennaro and Beth D'Onofrio, the RiverRun International Film Festival got its name from the French Broad River near Brevard, North Carolina, where the festival was originally held. In 2003, Dale Pollock, a former film producer and then-Dean of the School of Filmmaking at the University of North Carolina School of the Arts, moved RiverRun to Winston-Salem, where it resides today as an independent arts organization dedicated to showcasing the best new films from independent, international and student filmmakers.

Since 2014, the festival has been an Oscar-qualifying festival in the Animated short film category.

Festival Dates/Locations:

Notes

References

External links 
 

Film festivals in North Carolina
Animation film festivals in the United States
Tourist attractions in Winston-Salem, North Carolina
Film festivals established in 1998
1998 establishments in North Carolina